East Stanley was a constituency of the Legislative Council of the Falkland Islands which existed from 1977 until 1985. The constituency was created in 1977 with the implementation of the Falkland Islands (Legislative Council) Order 1977 and was abolished just eight years later when the Falkland Islands Constitution came into force in 1985. The constituency of East Stanley elected one member to the Legislative Council and consisted of the easterly area of the capital city. East Stanley is now part of the Stanley constituency. William Henry Goss represented the constituency throughout its existence.

Members 

Historic constituencies in the Falkland Islands